Tun Datuk Patinggi Temenggong Jugah anak Barieng, also known as Tun Jugah, (1903 – 8 July 1981) was a Malaysian politician of Iban descent from the state of Sarawak. He was the Paramount Chief of the Iban people for more than 55 years. They affectionately called him "Apai" meaning "father" in the Iban language.

Tun Jugah played a fundamental role in bringing the state of Sarawak into the formation of the Federation of Malaysia which materialized on 16 September 1963. He was the key signatory along with two others of behalf of Sarawak of the Malaysia Agreement 1963 in London. Sarawak had been made a British colony after the way and was granted its 
self-government on 22 July 1963. Thus, Tun Abdul Rahman Ya'kub said that Tun Jugah was "the bridge to Malaysia," i.e. without his signature, there wouldn't be any Malaysia today. However, his candidacy as the first Sarawak Governor was rejected by Tunku Abdul Rahman on the basis that the posts of the Sarawak Chief Minister and the Sarawak Governor cannot be both held by Iban at the same time.

He was illiterate in term of Western education, like so many other Ibans during his time. He signed documents by stamping his thumb print. However, he managed to become a state leader, i.e. the first Sarawakian and then was appointed the Federal Minister in charge of Sarawak Affairs in the Cabinet of Malaysia. He was famous for his often-quoted reminder before the formation of Malaysia, "Anang Malaysia baka tebu, manis ba pun tang tabar ka ujung," i.e. "Let Malaysia not be like the sugar cane, sweet at the beginning but tasteless towards the end". He was elected a member of Parliament during Malaysia's first elections in 1963.

Tun Jugah, who was Sarawak's Affairs Minister, was appointed as the first president of the United Traditional Bumiputera Party or Parti Pesaka Bumiputera Bersatu (PBB) until his death in 1981. The party was founded with the purpose of the improvement of the livelihood and protect the rights of the Sarawakian Bumiputera in many fields such as politics, economy and social.

PBB was formed from the combination of three parties in Sarawak; Parti Negara Sarawak (PANAS), Barisan Rakyat Jati Sarawak (BARJASA) and Parti Pesaka Anak Sarawak (PESAKA). Tun Jugah was one of the early members who instrumental in setting up Pesaka with other Iban Penghulus of Batang Rajang.

He died peacefully on 9 July 1981 at Kuching, leaving behind his wife Toh Puan Tiong anak Anding, his children and grandchildren.

His famous quote was "Anang aja Malaysia tu baka Tebu, Manis di pun, tabar Di ujung" (Let's hope that Malaysia will not end up as a sugarcane, sweet in the beginning, but turned less sweet in the end).

Honours

Honours of Malaysia
  : 
 Commander of the Order of the Defender of the Realm (P.M.N.) - Tan Sri (1964)
 Grand Commander of the Order of Loyalty to the Crown of Malaysia (S.S.M.) - Tun (1981)

Honours of the United Kingdom
 :
 Officer of the Order of the British Empire (1961)

Places named after him
 Jalan Tun Jugah, a major road and flyover in Kuching, the capital of the state of Sarawak
 Tun Jugah Shopping Centre

Literature
 Sutlive, Vinston (1992): Tun Jugah of Sarawak: Colonialism and Iban Response. Kuching: Sarawak Literary Society.

External links
 Homepage of the Tun Jugah Foundation

References

1903 births
1981 deaths
People from Sarawak
Iban people
Parti Pesaka Bumiputera Bersatu politicians
Malaysian political party founders
Members of the Dewan Rakyat
Officers of the Order of the British Empire
Government ministers of Malaysia
Grand Commanders of the Order of Loyalty to the Crown of Malaysia
Commanders of the Order of the Defender of the Realm